The 2023 United Arab Emirates Tri-Nation Series was the 20th round of the 2019–2023 ICC Cricket World Cup League 2 cricket tournament, which took place in the United Arab Emirates in February and March 2023. It was a tri-nation series between United Arab Emirates, Nepal and Papua New Guinea with the matches played in the One Day International (ODI) format. The World Cup League 2 tournament forms part of the qualification process for the 2023 Cricket World Cup.

Nepal's 42-run win against the UAE in the final match of the series kept them in contention for the third and final automatic place in the 2023 Cricket World Cup Qualifier, and confirmed that the UAE would have to earn a place via the World Cup Qualifier Play-off.

Squads

On 1 March 2023, Nepal's Mousom Dhakal was ruled out of series due to a shoulder injury, with Sandeep Lamichhane named as his replacement.
On 5 March 2023, Nepal's Kushal Bhurtel was ruled out of series due to an injury.

Fixtures

1st ODI

2nd ODI

3rd ODI

4th ODI

5th ODI

6th ODI

References

Notes

External links
 Series home at ESPNcricinfo

2023 in Emirati cricket
2023 in Nepalese cricket
2023 in Papua New Guinean cricket
International cricket competitions in 2022–23
United Arab Emirates
United Arab Emirates Tri-Nation Series
United Arab Emirates Tri-Nation Series
Cricket events postponed due to the COVID-19 pandemic